Raymond Charles Clevenger III (born August 27, 1937) is a Senior United States circuit judge of the United States Court of Appeals for the Federal Circuit.

Education and career

Clevenger was born in Topeka, Kansas. He was educated in the public schools in Topeka and at Phillips Academy in Andover, Massachusetts. Clevenger received a Bachelor of Arts degree from Yale University in 1959, graduating magna cum laude. After a stint at Morgan Guaranty Trust Company he earned a Bachelor of Laws at Yale Law School in 1966, graduating magna cum laude and Order of the Coif. He was a law clerk to Justice Byron White at the Supreme Court during the October term, 1966 and practiced law at Wilmer, Cutler & Pickering, in Washington, D.C. and London from 1967 to 1990.

Federal judicial service

Clevenger was nominated by President George H. W. Bush to the United States Court of Appeals for the Federal Circuit, to the seat vacated by Judge Oscar Hirsh Davis, on January 24, 1990. He was confirmed on April 27, 1990, received his commission on April 30, 1990 and assumed duties on May 3, 1990. He assumed senior status on February 1, 2006.

See also 
List of law clerks of the Supreme Court of the United States (Seat 6)

References

External links 

1937 births
Living people
20th-century American judges
Judges of the United States Court of Appeals for the Federal Circuit
Law clerks of the Supreme Court of the United States
United States court of appeals judges appointed by George H. W. Bush
Yale Law School alumni
Wilmer Cutler Pickering Hale and Dorr people